The Cheia is a right tributary of the river Olănești in Romania. It flows into the Olănești in Valea Cheii.

Tributaries
The following rivers are tributaries of the river Cheia (from source to mouth):

Left: Silița
Right: Valea Rece, Comarnice, Ionaș, Valea Neagră, Cracu Tisei, Lunga, Capu

References

Rivers of Romania
Rivers of Vâlcea County